New Britain is an island in Papua New Guinea.

New Britain may also refer to:

Places
New Britain, Connecticut, United States
New Britain, Pennsylvania, United States
 New Britain station
 New Britain Township, Bucks County, Pennsylvania
New Britain (Canada), a historical name for Labrador and the shores of Hudson Bay and James Bay

Music
New Britain (album), by Whitehouse, 1982
 "New Britain" (tune), the melody associated with "Amazing Grace"

Other
New Britain Party, a political party

See also

Britain (disambiguation)
 Names semantically and historically related to other similar names for British colonies, including: 
 New Britain (disambiguation)
 New Albion (disambiguation)
 New Scotland (disambiguation)
 Nova Scotia (disambiguation) 
 New Albany (disambiguation) 
 New Caledonia (disambiguation) 
 New England (disambiguation)
 New London (disambiguation)
 New Wales (disambiguation)